The twenty-eighth season of the Egyptian Premier League ended with Zamalek crowning its fifth title.
After Zamalek got 36 points, Al-Ahly ranked second with 34 points.

Participating clubs 
 Al-Ahly Club
 Zamalek Club
 Ismaili Club
 AL Ittihad Al Skandry
 Plastic Club
 Al Masry Club
 Olympic club
 Al Makwaloun Al Arab
 Ghazl Al Mahala
 Al Menia
 Al Tersana
 Al Kouroum

Scorers 
Ayman Shouky from Al Kouroum club with 8 goals

References

8
1
1983–84 in African association football leagues